Ultraman Trigger: New Generation Tiga is a Japanese tokusatsu drama series produced by Tsuburaya Productions. As the 33rd entry to the Ultra Series, the show presents itself as a modern retelling of Ultraman Tiga, while also celebrating its 25th anniversary.

Episodes

References

Bibliography

External links
Ultraman Trigger: New Generation Tiga at Tsuburaya Productions 
Ultraman Trigger: New Generation Tiga at TV Tokyo 

Ultraman episodes